The Lost Trident Sessions is a studio album by jazz fusion group the Mahavishnu Orchestra, released on 21 September 1999 through Sony Music Entertainment. It was originally recorded in June 1973 at Trident Studios but was not released until 26 years later. According to the album's detailed liner notes, in November 1998 Columbia Records producer Bob Belden stumbled upon two quarter-inch tapes in Columbia's Los Angeles vault whilst gathering material for a remastered reissue of the Mahavishnu Orchestra's 1973 album Birds of Fire. The tapes were otherwise unlabelled besides the recording location, but upon further inspection, they were revealed to be the two-track mixes for what would have been the Mahavishnu Orchestra's third studio album at the time.

Guitarist John McLaughlin told gig - The Music Magazine in 1977:

With the exception of "John's Song #2", all compositions on this album were performed on other albums.  The Mahavishnu Orchestra's 1973 live album, Between Nothingness and Eternity, consisted entirely of songs from the Trident sessions:  "Dream", "Trilogy" and "Sister Andrea." Violinist Jerry Goodman and keyboardist Jan Hammer performed "I Wonder" and "Steppings Tones" on their 1974 album Like Children.

Track listing

Personnel
John McLaughlin – guitar, production
Jan Hammer – electric piano, synthesizer, production
Billy Cobham – drums, production
Jerry Goodman – electric violin, viola, violow (custom viola with cello strings), production
Rick Laird – bass, production
Technical
Ken Scott – engineering
Mark Wilder – mastering
Bob Belden – production

Chart performance

References

External links
In Review: Mahavishnu Orchestra "The Lost Trident Sessions" at Guitar Nine Records

Mahavishnu Orchestra albums
1999 albums
Columbia Records albums
Albums produced by Bob Belden
Albums recorded at Trident Studios